Corail is an arrondissement of the Grand'Anse department, located in southwestern Haiti. As of 2015, the population was 131,561 inhabitants. Postal codes in the Anse d'Hainault Arrondissement start with the number 73.

Communes
The arrondissement contains the following communes:
 Beaumont
 Corail
 Pestel
 Roseaux

See also
Arrondissements of Haiti

References

Arrondissements of Haiti